Dhaka , formerly known as Dacca, is the capital of Bangladesh. It is the ninth-largest and the sixth-most densely populated city in the world, with a population of 8.9 million residents within the city limits, and a population of over 21 million residents in the Greater Dhaka Area. Dhaka is the economic, political, and cultural center of Bangladesh, and is one of the major cities in South Asia, the largest city in Eastern South Asia.

The major suburb areas which are a part of the Dhaka Metropolitan Area and Greater Dhaka urban area are:

Dhaka District

Dhaka North City Corporation

 Abdullahpur
 Uttara
 Mirpur
 Pallabi
 Kazipara
 Kafrul
 Agargaon
 Sher-e-Bangla Nagar
 Cantonment area
 Banani
 Gulshan
 Mohakhali
 Bashundhara
 Banasree
 Baridhara
 Uttarkhan
 Dakshinkhan
 Bawnia
 Khilkhet
 Tejgaon
 Farmgate
 Mohammadpur
 Rampura
 Badda
 Satarkul
 Beraid
 Khilgaon
 Vatara
 Gabtali

Dhaka South City Corporation

 Hazaribagh
 Dhanmondi
 Ramna
 Motijheel
 Sabujbagh
 Lalbagh
 Kamalapur
 Kamrangirchar
 Islampur
 Sadarghat
 Wari
 Kotwali
 Sutrapur
 Jurain
 Dania
 Demra
 Shyampur
 Nimtoli
 Matuail
 Shahbagh
 Paltan

Savar Upazila

 Ashulia
 Birulia
 Savar

Keraniganj Upazila

 Hasnabad
 Jinjira
 Tegharia
 Jhilmil

Gazipur District
 Tongi
 Gazipur

Narayanganj District

 Fatullah
 Siddhirganj
 Narayanganj

Purbachal

Purbachal Residential Model Town is the biggest planned township in Bangladesh. The project area consists of about 6,227 acres (25 square kilometer) land located in between the Shitalakhya and the Balu River at Rupgonj thana of Narayanganj District and at Kaligonj Thana of Gazipur District, in the northeastern side of Dhaka.

See also 
 Old Dhaka
 Neighbourhoods in Chittagong Metropolitan Area
 List of places of worship in Dhaka city

References

Geography of Dhaka
 L
Dhaka-related lists
Lists of neighbourhoods in Bangladeshi cities
Lists of neighbourhoods